Vagaysky District  is an administrative district (raion), one of the twenty-two in Tyumen Oblast, Russia. As a municipal division, it is incorporated as Vagaysky Municipal District. It is located in the east of the oblast. Its administrative center is the rural locality (a selo) of Vagay. Population: 22,539 (2010 Census);  The population of Vagay accounts for 22.2% of the district's total population.

References

Notes

Sources

Districts of Tyumen Oblast